Theodorus "Theo" Willems (22 February 1891 – 12 April 1960) was an archer from the Netherlands. He was born in Uden, North Brabant and died in Bakel, North Brabant.

He represented his native country at the 1920 Summer Olympics in Antwerp, Belgium. There he won the gold medal in the Men's Team Event (28 m), alongside Joep Packbiers, Janus Theeuwes, Driekske van Bussel, Jo van Gastel, Tiest van Gestel, Janus van Merrienboer, and Piet de Brouwer.

References

External links
 profile
 Dutch Olympic Committee 

1891 births
1960 deaths
Dutch male archers
Archers at the 1920 Summer Olympics
Olympic archers of the Netherlands
Olympic gold medalists for the Netherlands
Olympic medalists in archery
People from Uden
Medalists at the 1920 Summer Olympics
Sportspeople from North Brabant